Diamond Cut is the third studio album by Welsh singer Bonnie Tyler. It was released in February 1979 by RCA Records.

Critical reception 
Chuck Pratt of The Pittsburgh Press described the album as "a charmer", but stated that none of the songs were "blockbuster", like "It's a Heartache" from her previous album. He highlighted "The Eyes of a Fool", "What a Way to Treat My Heart" and "Louisiana Rain" as the best tracks.

Track listing

Personnel 

Bonnie Tyler – vocals
Robin Geoffrey Cable – engineer
Martin Jenner – acoustic guitar, electric guitar, steel guitar, slide guitar
Steve Wolfe – acoustic guitar, background vocals
Kevin Dunne – bass guitar
Dave Markee – bass guitar
Ed Hamilton – electric guitar
Alan Tarney – electric guitar
Gary Waghorn – electric guitar
Hugh Burns – electric guitar, mandolin
Mike Barker – dobro
Neil Adams – drums
Henry Spinetti – drums
Graham Smith – harmonica
Tony Lambert – keyboards
Pete Wingfield – keyboards
Jasper – Moog synthesizer, bells, cowbell
Chris Mercer – tenor saxophone
Frank Tomes – tuba
Mike McNaught – string, oboe and French horn arrangements
John Cameron – arrangement on "(The World is Full of) Married Men"

Charts

Album

Year–end charts

Release history

References 

1979 albums
Bonnie Tyler albums
CBS Records albums
Albums recorded at RAK Studios